Thalanur  is a village in the  
Avadaiyarkoilrevenue block of Pudukkottai district, Tamil Nadu, India.

Demographics 

As per the 2001 census, Thalanur had a total population of 1357 with 655 males and 702 females. Out of the total population 883 people were literate.

References

Villages in Pudukkottai district